Early fortifications of Sweden were built to defend self-governing provinces, with rapid expansion of forts in the 14th century and again later in the 16th century, when Sweden became independent and needed to protect its borders. 

Changes in the position of borders led to fortifications changing owner, to and from Sweden; some became redundant; and a few forts were given major upgrades for improved technology over the centuries.

List of fortifications
12C
Bulverket
Visborg
Vyborg Castle

13C
Axevalla House
Falkenberg (fort)
Walls of Stockholm

14C
Hundred Years' War and Black Death
Old Älvsborg – original
Bohus Fortress [‡]
Kastelholm Castle
Sibbesborg
Styresholm
Varberg Fortress - original

15C
Unification under one king and expansion of territory with first Union with Norway and Denmark
Shlisselburg – rebuilt

16C
Sweden gains independence and Protestant Reformation, Livonian War, creation of Sweden's first professional army.
Vaxholm Fortress - original

17C
Ingrian War, Kalmar War, Thirty Years' War and Second Northern War saw Swedish territory expand.
New Älvsborg – rebuilt
Carlsten [‡]
Dalarö Fortress
Fortifications of Gothenburg
Karlsvärd Fortress
Kastellet, Stockholm –original
Nyenschantz
Skansen Kronan
Skansen Lejonet
Varberg Fortress - rebuilt

18C
After Swedish defeats in the Great Northern War as well as in the Russo-Swedish War of 1741-1743, there was a need to construct fortifications to guard both the border as well as the coast of Finland.
Suomenlinna
Svartholm fortress

19C
Union with Norway after Norway ceded to Sweden by Denmark
Fårösund Fortress
Karlsborg Fortress [‡]
Vaberget Fortress
Vaxholm Fortress - rebuilt

20C
Dissolution of the union between Norway and Sweden, neutral in First and Second World Wars. Cold War era.
Boden Fortress [‡]
Femöre battery
Järflotta	
Kastellet, Stockholm - rebuilt
Skåne Line
Älvsborg Fortress

[‡] Currently in use by the Swedish Military

See also 
 Swedish Armed Forces
 Swedish Coastal Artillery
 Swedish Fortifications Agency
 History of Sweden

References